Jerome Donald Olsavsky (born March 29, 1967) is a former professional American football linebacker and coach in the National Football League (NFL). He played for the Pittsburgh Steelers, Baltimore Ravens and the Cincinnati Bengals.

Playing career
Olsavsky was born in the industrial town of Youngstown, Ohio. He gained early recognition as a star football player at Chaney High School and went on to play collegiately at the University of Pittsburgh. Following his graduation, he was drafted by the Steelers in the 1989 NFL Draft. Olsavsky finished his playing career in 1998 with the Baltimore Ravens.

Coaching
When Olsavsky ended his career in professional football, he spent several years coaching in various places, such as Carnegie Mellon University. He also served as an assistant strength coach at North Carolina for one season. He then served as an assistant football coach at Youngstown State University for seven seasons coaching linebackers.

Steelers
Jerry was hired on January 29, 2010 to serve as the defensive assistant for the Pittsburgh Steelers, replacing Lou Spanos. He was promoted to inside linebackers coach on February 6, 2015. On February 22, 2023, the Steelers hired Aaron Curry to replace Olsavsky as their inside linebackers coach.

Family
Jerry resides in Pittsburgh with his three children, Joseph, Emma, and Dominic.

References

1967 births
Living people
American football linebackers
Baltimore Ravens players
Pittsburgh Panthers football players
Pittsburgh Steelers coaches
Pittsburgh Steelers players
Players of American football from Youngstown, Ohio
Youngstown State Penguins football coaches
Ed Block Courage Award recipients